The Kids in the Hall: Comedy Punks is a Canadian documentary film, directed by Reginald Harkema and released in 2022. Released to coincide with Amazon Prime's relaunch of the influential Canadian sketch comedy series The Kids in the Hall and based partially on Paul Myers's 2018 book The Kids in the Hall: One Dumb Guy, the film documents the history of the troupe through both archival footage and contemporary interviews with the members, largely filmed at The Rivoli, the Toronto club where the troupe got their start on stage.

The film also includes segments with other actors and comedians commenting on the troupe's influence, including Fred Armisen, Jay Baruchel, Lewis Black, Janeane Garofalo, Eddie Izzard, Mae Martin, Mike Myers, Eric McCormack and Lorne Michaels.

The film premiered on March 15, 2022 at the SXSW festival, and had its Canadian premiere at the 2022 Hot Docs Canadian International Documentary Festival, in advance of its launch on Amazon on May 20 as a companion to the new season of the series.

References

External links
 

2022 films
2022 documentary films
Canadian documentary films
The Kids in the Hall
Amazon Prime Video original films
2020s English-language films
2020s Canadian films